Ayşe Bera Süzer (born 1 January 1996) is a Turkish compound archer.

Career
At the 2018 European Archery Championships in Legnica, Poland, she won the gold medal in the women's team recurve event.

In 2022, she won the bronze medal in the women's team compound event at the European Indoor Archery Championships held in Laško, Slovenia. She also won the bronze medal in the women's individual compound event. She won the silver medal in the women'svteam compound event at the Antalya, Turkey event in the 2022 Archery World Cup.

She won the bronze medal in the women's individual compound event at the 2022 European Archery Championships held in Munich, Germany. She also won the bronze medal in the women's team compound event.

References

External links
 

1996 births
Living people
Turkish female archers
21st-century Turkish sportswomen
Islamic Solidarity Games medalists in archery